Achena Uttam is a 2022 Bengali-language biographical film directed by Atanu Bose and produced by Alaknanda Arts. Music is composed by Upali Chattopadhyay. The storyline of the film is based on Uttam Kumar.

Cast
 Saswata Chatterjee as Uttam Kumar 
 Rituparna Sengupta as Suchitra Sen
 Ditipriya Roy as Sabitri Chatterjee
 Srabanti Chatterjee as Gouri Devi
 Biswanath Basu as Tarun Kumar
 Sampurna Lahiri as Sumitra Mukherjee 
 Priyanshu Chatterjee as Satyajit Ray
 Tirtha Raj Bose as Uttam Kumar (Young)
 Sayantani Raychaudhuri as Supriya Devi
 Sneha Das as Gouri Devi (Young)

Soundtrack 

The film uses a song written by Uttam Kumar.

Release 
On July 1, 2022, the trailer of the film Achena Uttam was released. The film was released theatrically on 22 July 2022.

References 

Bengali-language Indian films
Indian children's films
2020s Bengali-language films